A traveller's cheque is a medium of exchange that can be used in place of hard currency. They can be denominated in one of a number of major world currencies and are preprinted, fixed-amount cheques designed to allow the person signing it to make an unconditional payment to someone else as a result of having paid the issuer for that privilege.

They were generally used by people on vacation in foreign countries instead of cash, as many businesses used to accept traveller's cheques as currency. The incentive for merchants and other parties to accept them lies in the fact that as long as the original signature (which the buyer is supposed to place on the cheque in ink as soon as they receive the cheque) and the signature made at the time the cheque is used are the same, the cheque's issuer will unconditionally guarantee payment of the face amount even if the cheque was fraudulently issued, stolen, or lost. This means that a traveller's cheque can never 'bounce' unless the issuer goes bankrupt or out of business. If a traveller's cheque were lost or stolen, it could be replaced by the issuing financial institution.

The financial institutions issuing traveller's cheques earn income in a number of ways. Firstly, they charge a fee on sale of such cheques. In addition, they can earn interest for the period that the cheques are uncashed, while not paying any interest to the cheque holder, making them effectively interest-free loans. Also, the foreign exchange rate commonly used on traveller's cheques (generally based on rates applicable at the time of purchase) is less favourable compared to other forms of obtaining foreign currency, especially those on credit card transactions (which use a rate applicable at the transaction date). In addition, the setup cost and the cost of issuing and processing traveller's cheques is much higher than for credit card transactions. The cheque issuer carries the exchange rate risk, and normally pays a fee to hedge against the risk.

Their use has been in decline since the 1990s, when a variety of more convenient alternatives, such as credit cards, debit cards, money transfer services, pre-paid currency cards, and automated teller machines that accept foreign cards, became more widely available and easier for travellers to use. Also, as interest rates sharply declined in many developed countries in the late 20th and early 21st centuries, travellers's cheques became much less profitable to issue and thus many issuers scaled back advertising and promoting their use while others stopped selling them altogether. Traveller's cheques are no longer widely accepted and cannot easily be cashed, even at the banks that issued them. The alternatives to traveller's cheques are generally cheaper and more flexible. Travel money cards, for instance, provide features similar to traveller's cheques but offer greater ease and flexibility.

Terminology 
Legally, the parties to traveller's cheque transactions are as follows. The organization that produces a traveller's cheque is the obligor or issuer. The bank or other place that sells it is the agent of the issuer. The natural person who buys the cheque is the purchaser. The entity to whom the purchaser hands the cheque in payment for goods or services is the payee or merchant. For purposes of clearance, the obligor is both maker and drawee.

History 

Traveller's cheques were first issued on 1 January 1772 by the London Credit Exchange Company for use in 90 European cities, and in 1874, Thomas Cook was issuing "circular notes" that operated in the manner of traveller's cheques.

American Express developed a large-scale international traveller's cheque system in 1891, to supersede the traditional letters of credit. It is still the largest issuer of traveller's cheques today by volume.  American Express's introduction of traveller's cheques is traditionally attributed to employee Marcellus Flemming Berry, after company president J. C. Fargo had problems in smaller European cities obtaining funds with a letter of credit.

Between the 1850s and the 1990s, traveller's cheques became one of the main ways that people took money on vacation for use in foreign countries without the risks associated with carrying large amounts of cash.

Several brands of traveller's cheques have been marketed; the most familiar of those were Thomas Cook Group, Bank of America and American Express.

Declining use 
The convenience and wider acceptance of such alternatives as credit and debit cards and the wider availability of ATMs has led to a significant decline in the use of traveller's cheques since the 1990s. In addition, security concerns of retailers has led to many businesses ceasing to accept them, in turn making them less attractive to travellers. This has led to complaints about the difficulty that holders have in using them. In much of Europe and Asia, traveller's cheques are no longer widely accepted and cannot be easily cashed, even at the banks that issued them.

Since traveller's cheques do not earn interest, one of the main incentives financial institutions have to sell traveller's cheques is that they effectively represent an interest-free loan from the purchaser to the seller. The sustained decline in interest rates in most of the developed world since the early-to-mid 1990s has substantially reduced the profitability of traveller's cheques for their issuers. Financial institutions have responded to this development by charging new fees for traveller's cheques, increasing existing fees, or by exiting the business altogether.

Usage

Purchasing cheques for later use 
Travellers' cheques are sold by banks and agencies to customers for use at a later time. Upon obtaining custody of a purchased supply of traveller's cheques, the purchaser immediately signs each cheque. The purchaser also receives a receipt and other documentation that should be kept in a safe place other than where they carry the cheques. Traveller's cheques can usually be replaced if lost or stolen, assuming the owner still has the receipt issued with the purchase of the cheques showing the serial numbers allocated.

Cashing cheques 
To cash a traveller's cheque to make a purchase, the purchaser would, in the presence of the payee, date and countersign the cheque in the indicated space.

Denomination and change 
Traveller's cheques are available in several currencies such as US dollars, Canadian dollars, pounds sterling, Japanese yen, Chinese yuan and euros; denominations usually being 20, 50, or 100 (× 100 for yen) of whatever currency, and are usually sold in pads of five or ten cheques, e.g., 5 × €20 for €100. Traveller's cheques do not expire, so unused cheques can be kept by the purchaser to spend at any time in the future. The purchaser of a supply of traveller's cheques effectively gives an interest-free loan to the issuer, which is why it is common for banks to sell them "commission free" to their customers. The commission, where it is charged, is usually 1–2% of the total face value sold.

Any change for a purchase transaction would be given in the local currency.

Deposit and settlement 
A payee receiving a traveller's cheque would follow its normal procedures for depositing cheques into its bank account: usually, endorsement by stamp or signature and listing the cheque and its amount on the deposit slip. The bank account will be credited with the amount of the cheque as with any other negotiable item submitted for clearance.

In the United States, if the payee is equipped to process cheques electronically at point of sale (see: Check 21 Act), they would still take custody of the cheque and submit it to a financial institution, particularly to avoid any confusion on the part of the purchaser.

Security issues 
One of the main advantages traveller's cheques provide is the replacement if lost or stolen.

However, this feature has also created a black market where fraudsters buy traveller's cheques, sell them at 50% of their value to other people (such as travellers) and falsely report their traveller's cheque stolen with the company from which the cheque was obtained. As such, the fraudster gets back the value of the traveller's cheque and also makes 50% of the value as profit.

The widespread problem of counterfeit traveller's cheques has caused a number of businesses to no longer accept them or to impose stringent safeguards when they are used.  It is a reasonable security procedure for the payee to ask to inspect the purchaser's picture ID; a driver's license or passport should suffice, and doing so would most usefully be towards the end of comparing the purchaser's signature on the ID with those on the cheque. The best first step, however, that can be taken by any payee who has concerns about the validity of any traveller's cheque, is to contact the issuer directly; a negative finding by a third-party cheque verification service based on an ID cheque may merely indicate that the service has no record about the purchaser (to be expected, practically by definition, of many travellers), or at worst that they have been deemed incompetent to manage a personal chequing account (which would have no bearing on the validity of a traveller's cheque).

Some purchasers have found the process of filing a claim for lost or stolen cheques is cumbersome, and have been left without recourse after their cheques were lost or stolen.

Alternatives 
The widespread acceptance of credit cards and debit cards around the world starting in the 1980s and 1990s significantly replaced the use of traveller's cheques for paying for things on vacation.

In 2005, American Express released the American Express Travelers Cheque Card, a stored-value card that serves the same purposes as a traveller's cheque, but can be used in stores like a credit card. It discontinued the card in October 2007.  A number of other financial companies went on to issue stored-value or pre-paid debit cards containing several currencies that could be used like credit or debit cards at shops and at ATMs, mimicking the traveller's cheque in electronic form. One of the major examples is the Visa TravelMoney card.

See also 

 Cashier's check
 Certified check
 Eurocheque
 Money order

References 

Cheques
Travel gear
1770s introductions
British inventions